Empire Interactive was a British video game developer and publisher based in London. Founded in 1987 by Ian Higgins and Simon Jeffrey, it was acquired by Silverstar Holdings in 2006 and went out of business in 2009.

History 
Empire Interactive was established by Ian Higgins (chief executive officer) and Simon Jeffrey (managing director) in 1987. In November 2000, the company acquired development studio Razorworks.

As well as full priced titles, Empire also had a budget range of titles, Xplosiv, for PC and PS2. Initially launched for PC in January 2000, Xplosiv published titles in Europe from third parties such as Sega and Microsoft. Later, in 2003 Empire launched titles for PS2.

In March 2002 Empire acquired music creation software eJay.

Silverstar Holdings, a U.S. public company listed on NASDAQ, offered to acquired Empire Interactive in late October 2006. The deal was accepted by 90% of Empire Interactive's shareholders by late November, and so Silverstar Holdings acquired 85% of Empire Interactive's shares. Admissions of further Empire Interactive shares on the Alternative Investments Market of the London Stock Exchange, were expected to be cancelled, effective on 20 December. Higgins stepped down from his position in May 2008. In July, Empire Interactive reduced its staff count by 30%, with the intent to sell Razorworks. Razorworks was sold to and absorbed by Rebellion Developments a few days later. After Silverstar Holdings was delisted from NASDAQ in March 2009, Empire Interactive was placed into administration on 1 May 2009, with KPMG Restructuring appointed as administrator. Subsequently, 49 out of 55 employees were laid off, with the remaining six staying to aiding KPMG Restructuring in the winding-down of the company. Empire Interactive's intellectual property was sold to U.S.-based company New World IP. Shortly thereafter, U.S. publisher Zoo Publishing acquired an exclusive licence for the publishing and distribution of Empire Interactive from New World IP.

Games

References 

Companies that have entered administration in the United Kingdom
Video game companies established in 1987
Video game companies disestablished in 2009
Defunct video game companies of the United Kingdom
Video game development companies
Video game publishers
Defunct companies based in London